Pseudomonas trivialis is a fluorescent, Gram-negative bacterium isolated from the phyllosphere of grasses. The type strain is DSM 14937.

References

External links
Type strain of Pseudomonas trivialis at BacDive -  the Bacterial Diversity Metadatabase

Pseudomonadales
Bacteria described in 2003